In category theory, a branch of mathematics, the simplicial localization of a category C with respect to a class W of morphisms of C is a simplicial category LC whose  is the localization  of C with respect to W; that is,  for any objects x, y in C. The notion is due to Dwyer and Kan.

References 
W. G. Dwyer and Dan Kan, Simplicial localizations of categories
http://math.mit.edu/~mdono/_Juvitop.pdf

External links 

Category theory